Ulnar collateral ligament (or UCL), may refer to:

 Ulnar carpal collateral ligament
 Ulnar collateral ligament of elbow joint
 Ulnar collateral ligament of thumb